Fleur Mino is a French soprano living in Paris.

Early life and education 

Fleur Mino began classical singing in 1998 in Clermont-Ferrand with the Centre d'Art Polyphonique d'Auvergne. Then, she joined the Conservatoire à rayonnement régional de Lyon and followed a Master in Musicology at the Lyon Lumière University.

In 2006, Fleur Mino studied theatre and dance at the International Music Theatre Academy in Paris.

Career

On stage (roles) 

From 2000 on, she began singing on stage with le Concert de l'Hostel Dieu, conducted by Franck-Emmanuel Comte. She also sang at the Festival d'Ambronay under the direction of Pierre Cao and in 2003, she played in The Fairy Queen staged by Philippe Chambon at the Opéra de Lyon.
In 2007, she was chosen to play Pamina in The Magic Flute and kept the role during the whole season at the Théâtre Comedia in Paris. The same year, she played The Little Mermaid, staged by Johan Nus at the Olympia, the Opéra Bastille and for an international tour.

In 2008, she sang in Pinocchio at the Palais des Congrès de Paris  and for a tour in France and abroad (among others at the Théâtre antique de Carthage) and in 2010, she discovered the Théâtre du Châtelet with Broadway Lights, conducted by David Charles Abell. In 2011, she played several times at the Théâtre des Folies Bergères in The Suicide Shop and in 2012, Fleur Mino performed twice at the Théâtre de Lamalou-les-Bains, first in Die Fledermaus playing Ida and then in Rip by Robert Planquette, in which she played Nelly and Lowena during the whole season.

During the 2013/2014 season, she performed many times in Belgium. Among others, she played Maria, in The Sound of Music at the Palais des beaux-arts de Charleroi and for a tour in the country and sang for the Strauss Impérial show at the Opéra Royal de Wallonie in Liège.
In 2015, she played in La Chaste Suzanne at the Tourcoing theatre and performed Marie in Les Mousquetaires au couvent at the Nivelles theatre in Belgium.

Recitals 

In September 2014, she gave a concert with the pianist Simon Ghraichy in the Jeita Grotto, in Lebanon, and in 2015, she sang with the British pianist Kevin Amos in a recital named Classical Broadway at the Esplanade in Singapore.
She is also the co-founder of the Sun & Moon Ensemble with Kevin Amos, Katarzyna Alemany and Juan-Carlos Echeverry.

References

Links 
 Fleur Mino official website

Living people
French operatic sopranos
Year of birth missing (living people)